Abdel Aziz Issa Abdul-Mohsin Al-Muqrin (also Abd al-Aziz al-Moqrin and other transliterations), alias Abu Hajr (ابو هاجر) and Abu Hazim, (1971–2004), was the leader of the militant Jihadist group al-Qaeda in Saudi Arabia. He succeeded Khaled Ali Hajj, when the latter was killed by Saudi security forces in March 2004. Al-Muqrin had trained with Osama bin Laden's Al-Qaeda in Afghanistan.

Al-Muqrin lived in the Riyadh's Al-Suwaidi District, home to many Saudi extremists.

Life
Al-Muqrin was born to middle-class parents in Riyadh and was a high school dropout. He married at the age of 19 and had one daughter. He left his wife in about 1988 to fight the Soviets in Afghanistan and later fought in Bosnia-Herzegovina. In the 1990s he ran guns from Spain to Algeria. Most of his training occurred in jihadist camps in Afghanistan. He was reported to have fought against Ethiopian forces in the Ogaden.

In 1995 he was arrested in Ethiopia and accused of taking part in a botched assassination attempt on Egyptian president, Hosni Mubarak. He was extradited to Saudi Arabia where he served a two-year prison term in Jeddah. His prison sentence was reduced after he memorized the Qur'an.

He was a skilled propagandist, using the Internet to recruit and deliver his message. Al-Muqrin told an Arabic website in 2003 that, "I have taken it upon myself and I have sworn to purge the Arabian Peninsula of the polytheists. We will fight the Crusaders and Jews in this country. They will not have any security until we evict them from the land of the Two Holy Places and until we evict them from the land of Palestine and the land of the Muslims, which they pillage and usurp from the east to the west."

Mohsen Al-Awaji, an expert in extremism, said in media interviews in 2004 that Al-Muqrin was "shallow, very simple-minded," adding that he "has no political brain. He's got the weapon and no mind to control the weapon." By contrast, Michael Scheuer, a former CIA intelligence officer, has described Muqrin as a strategist who wrote about insurgency doctrine. Muqrin wrote a book on military strategy called A Practical Course for Guerrilla War, which has been compared with Abu Bakr Naji's Management of Savagery as a book that has influenced Al Qaeda's thinking on guerrilla warfare.

Al-Muqrin was No. 1 on Saudi Arabia's second official list of most wanted terrorists, which was published in December 2003. In 2004 his faction claimed responsibility for a series of attacks against Westerners in Saudi Arabia including the June 2004 shooting that seriously wounded BBC correspondent Frank Gardner and killed cameraman Simon Cumbers, and the kidnapping and beheading of American contractor Paul Johnson. On the same day of the murder of Johnson, Saudi police commandos killed Al-Muqrin in a gun battle at a gas station in downtown Riyadh along with several associates including:
Faisal Abdul-Rahman Abdullah al-Dakhil (who was also on the list),
Turki bin Fuheid al-Muteiry, and
Ibrahim bin Abdullah al-Dreiham.

Al-Muqrin was responsible for the May 29 attacks at Al-Khobar that left more than 20 people dead and several other operations.

The online magazine Al-Khansaa claims to have been founded by al-Muqrin shortly before his death. In 2004, plans were discovered posted online under al-Muqrin's name containing the itinerary, routes of travel, and security personnel of Prince Nayef bin Abdel Aziz, and plans to assassinate him with RPGs.

References

Artist's rendering of al-Muqrin, originally from a Saudi wanted list

1972 births
2004 deaths
Deaths by firearm in Saudi Arabia
Saudi Arabian al-Qaeda members
People extradited from Ethiopia
People extradited to Saudi Arabia
Salafi jihadists
Bosnian mujahideen